Eugene Emmett Garbee (May 29, 1907 – November 8, 1996) was an American football and basketball coach and college administrator.  He was the third head football coach and the first head basketball coach at Appalachian State Teachers College—now known as Appalachian State University—located in Boone, North Carolina.

Garbee was born on May 29, 1907 in Billings, Missouri. He graduated from Southwest Missouri State Teacher's College–now known as Missouri State University–in 1931 with a bachelor's degree.  He later earned a master's degree from George Peabody College—now Peabody College, a division of Vanderbilt University—and a doctorate from New York University.  He taught health and physical education at Drake University from 1949 to 1952. Garbee was president of Upper Iowa University from 1952 to 1970. He died on November 8, 1996 in Winslow, Arizona.

Head coaching record

Football

Basketball

References

External links
 

1907 births
1996 deaths
Heads of universities and colleges in the United States
Appalachian State Mountaineers athletic directors
Appalachian State Mountaineers football coaches
Appalachian State Mountaineers men's basketball coaches
Basketball coaches from Missouri
Drake University faculty
Missouri State Bears football players
New York University alumni
Peabody College alumni
People from Billings, Missouri